Leslie Gordon Punch (10 July 1895 – 8 July 1948) was an Australian rules footballer who played with Footscray in the Victorian Football League (VFL).

Notes

External links 

1895 births
1948 deaths
Australian rules footballers from Victoria (Australia)
Footscray Football Club (VFA) players
Western Bulldogs players